The Kuwait 25th Commando Brigade of the Kuwait Army, commonly known as the 25th Commando, is one of Kuwait's various principal Commando brigades. The 25th Commando operates at the disposition of the respective commander who reports to the respective leadership of the Military of Kuwait; executing, participating, supporting, and carrying all conflicts in which the Military of Kuwait engaged since inception in 1960. The 25th Commando executes general operations in support of the Military of Kuwait.

Creation 
The 25th Commando Brigade was founded in 1960 by the deputy commander of Kuwait Army, Brigadier General Mubarak Abdullah Al-Jaber Al-Sabah prior to the forming of the first Government of Kuwait. An initial selection pool of 33 commando specialists were selected to form the 1st specialized platoon; which was considered the initial forming of the 25th Commando Brigade.

Development and establishment 
The 1st specialized platoon of the 25th Commando was established in 1960. Following the initial establishment, came the forming of 1st company of specialized forces in 1961. In 1962, the 1st specialized force unit was formed and operated from the Kuwait 15th Mubarak Armored Brigade. During that time, the 1st specialized force unit operated extensively and trained continuously in the deserts of Kuwait. As the enlistments of initial specialists increased; their administrative requirements complemented the need. As a result, an administrative bureau was in need and due to the unavailability and incapacity of building infrastructures in the remote desert areas of operations; the bureau initially temporarily operated out of a designated training ground.

Shortly after, the commandos of the 1st specialized force unit were called to operate out of the Kuwait Army's 6th Mechanized Brigade in 1965; known later as the Kuwait 6th Liberation Mechanized Brigade following the liberation of Kuwait during the Gulf War. The 1st specialized force unit was moved and the specialized force battalion was officially formed. Following in 1966, the forming of 2nd specialized force battalion followed.

In 1970, both Commando battalions were united and were stationed in the Kuwait 6th Liberation Mechanized Brigade. During the same year, an executive military organization order on January 31 1971, was issued and changed the designation of the 1st specialized force battalion to a designated Commando Battalion; similarly, the 2nd specialized force battalion to another designated Commando Battalion.

In 1972, another executive military organization order was issued; requesting the transformation of the two Commando Battalions to infantry battalions.

In 1973, the Commando unit was formed and stationed to a location where they were designated as Commando Forces. In 1975, Commando Forces established an official commando qualified training ground. In 1987, the Commando Forces were redesignated and renamed to Commando Battalion. Following in 1994, the Commando battalion was officially known as Commando specialized force.

With the Lebanese Civil War in 1975, units of the Kuwait 25th Commando Brigade were sent to Lebanon to protect the Kuwaiti Embassy in Beirut. In 1993, a small number of 25th CB operators were sent to Somalia.

In parallel application with the 25th Commando and mainly at the level of leading Arab international diplomacy and humanitarianism, the State of Kuwait played a supporting pivotal role in bringing the Lebanese Civil War to a halt (1975–1990). A mission for this purpose was led by  Sheikh Sabah Al-Ahmad Al-Jaber Al-Sabah; then Minister of Foreign Affairs of Kuwait during the reign of Emir of Kuwait, Sheikh Jaber Al-Ahmad Al-Jaber Al-Sabah.

In 2000, the former Deputy Prime Minister of Kuwait and Minister of Defense Sheikh Salem Sabah Al-Salem Al-Sabah signed on the recommended organization of the 25th Commando Battalion.

In the following years, Deputy Prime Minister and Minister of Defense Sheikh Jaber Al-Mubarak Al-Hamad Al-Sabah officially designated the Kuwait 25th Commando Brigade as one of the State of Kuwait's various official Commando initiatives in the Military of Kuwait, during the reign of Emir of Kuwait, Sheikh Sabah Al-Ahmad Al-Jaber Al-Sabah.

Notable officers 
 Mubarak Abdullah Al-Jaber Al-Sabah
 Fahad Al-Ahmed Al-Jaber Al-Sabah

References

Bibliography
 

Counterterrorist organizations
Military of Kuwait
Military units and formations established in 1960
Special forces units and formations